Oddo Biasini (13 May 1917 – 8 July 2009) was an Italian politician. He was a partisan during the Second World War and a prominent member of the Italian Republican Party.

Biography
Oddo Biasini graduated in letters at the University of Florence in 1940; in 1944 he was a republican partisan together with Libero Gualtieri and Osvaldo Abbondanza. After the war he worked as a teacher of Italian and Latin and was Principal of the scientific high school of Cesena from 1958 to 1968.

A trusted man of Ugo La Malfa, in the 70's he was elected national secretary of the Italian Republican Party. He was the chairman of his party's parliamentary group from 16 December 1974 to 24 February 1976 and from 15 July 1976 to 19 June 1979 and vice-president of the Chamber of Deputies from 1983 to 1987.

Between the end of the 60s and the beginning of the 70s he served as an Undersecretary for Public Education in the first (1968–69) and third Rumor Cabinet (1970) and in the Colombo Cabinet (1970–71).

He also served as a Minister of Cultural and Environmental Heritage from 1980 to 1981 in the Cossiga II Cabinet and Forlani Cabinet.

He died on 8 July 2009.

Honours and awards 
 : Grand Cross Knight of the Order of Merit of the Italian Republic (12 December 1993)
 : Gold Medal for the Meritorious of Culture and Art (5 August 1983)
 : Gold Medal for the Meritorious of the School of Culture and Art (31 July 1973)

References

External links
 
 
 
 
 

1917 births
2009 deaths
People from Cesena
Italian Republican Party politicians
Deputies of Legislature V of Italy
Deputies of Legislature VI of Italy
Deputies of Legislature VII of Italy
Deputies of Legislature VIII of Italy
Deputies of Legislature IX of Italy
Politicians of Emilia-Romagna
University of Florence alumni
Teachers of Italian